The national anthem of New Caledonia is La Marseillaise, the national anthem of France.

However, you may be looking for Soyons unis, devenons frères, the anthem of New Caledonia formally adopted in 2010.